Shipping is the transportation of cargo.

Shipping may also refer to:

 Shipping line, a business that operates ships that it may or may not own
 Shipping portal, a web-based point of access to multiple shipping lines' booking, tracking & communication systems
 Ship transport, transporting people and cargo by ship
 Shipping (fandom), an interest in or emotional response to fictional relationships
 The Shipment (Star Trek: Enterprise), a Star Trek: Enterprise television episode from season three
 The Shipment (film), a 2001 movie about a mob enforcer who is hired to recover a shipment of Viagra gone awry

See also 

 List of ship companies